Normalograptidae is an extinct family of graptolites.

Genera
List of genera from Maletz (2014):

†Clinoclimacograptus Bulman & Rickards, 1968
†Cystograptus Hundt, 1942
†Hedrograptus Obut, 1949
? †Hirsutograptus Koren’ & Rickards, 1996
? †Limpidograptus Khaletskaya, 1962
†Lithuanograptus Paskevicius, 1976
†Metaclimacograptus Bulman & Rickards, 1968
†Neodicellograptus Mu & Wang, 1977 in Wang & Jin (1977)
†Neoglyptograptus Rickards et al. 1995
†Normalograptus Legrand, 1987
†Pseudoglyptograptus Bulman & Rickards, 1968
†Retioclimacis Mu et al., 1974
†Rhaphidograptus Bulman, 1936
†Scalarigraptus Riva, 1988
†Sichuanograptus Zhao, 1976
†Skanegraptus Maletz, 2011c
†Talacastograptus Cuerda, Rickards & Cingolani, 1988

References

Graptolites
Prehistoric hemichordate families